Germany, Pale Mother is a 1980 West German drama film written and directed by Helma Sanders-Brahms. It was shown at the 30th Berlin International Film Festival in 1980, where it was nominated for a Golden Bear award. It was not released in the United States until 1984.

The film was restored and re-released in the UK in 2015 by the British Film Institute.

The title is taken from the poem of the same name by Bertolt Brecht.

Synopsis
In the 1930s, Hans is attracted to Lene, the only dark-haired one of a German family of seven sisters. As Hans's friend, Ulrich, is a member of the Nazi party, Lene is reluctant to see Hans but, after ascertaining that Hans is not a Nazi, she agrees to see him, and they eventually marry. On Lene's birthday, she learns that Hans has been conscripted to fight in Poland because he is a low-level bureaucrat who is not in the party, while Ulrich has been spared. In Poland, Hans murders civilians and has a hard time adjusting to war, like many other soldiers. When he returns on leave, he and Lene conceive a child, Anna, who is born during an air raid.

After their home is bombed, Lene takes Anna to see Hans, back on a two-day leave. Though Lene is happy to see him, he becomes jealous of Anna and Anna of him. To keep herself and Anna safe from the war, Lene treks on foot across the country. After the war, she is raped by two American soldiers in front of Anna. Eventually heading home, Lene reunites with a sister and, later, Hans. Over time, their reunion unravels as he is continually paranoid that she was unfaithful when he was away. He is also harsh with Anna over her schoolwork, sporadically beating her and constantly criticizing her. After the war, he reunites with Ulrich, who briefly encourages Anna to tease Hans. The teasing breaks Hans' cheerful mood (whose fragility is likely due to post-traumatic stress), leading him to beat Anna to tears.

Depressed, Lene contracts facial paralysis. Hans comes home, happy about his promotion, to discover his wife's condition. He takes her to the doctor, who informs them that all her teeth must be removed to stop the paralysis from spreading. Against her will Hans, noting that life is more important, orders the extraction. This further isolates and depresses Lene whose facial paralysis persists, who takes to her bed, withdraws from Anna, and wears a veil when she has to go out.

Ulrich and Hans maintain good relations, until one night, after they have been drinking, Hans learns Ulrich has been promoted above him. Ulrich justifies it by his qualifications. Hans, embittered by Ulrich's promotions, no longer attracted to Lene, and tired of her depression, does not react when Lene tells him she does not want to live anymore. He leaves for work, and Lene locks herself in the bathroom, intending to gas herself. Anna cries and begs her to come out, and eventually, she does.

Cast
 Eva Mattes as Lene
 Ernst Jacobi as Hans
 Elisabeth Stepanek as Hanne
 Angelika Thomas as Lydia
 Rainer Friedrichsen as Ulrich
 Gisela Stein as Aunt Ihmchen
 Fritz Lichtenhahn as Uncle Bertrand
 Anna Sanders as Anna

Awards
In 1980, the film won the Grand Prix at the Créteil International Women's Film Festival and was nominated for the Golden Berlin Bear at the 30th Berlin International Film Festival.

References

Further reading

Anton Kaes. From Hitler to Heimat: The Return of History as Film. Cambridge, Massachusetts: Harvard University Press, 1989.

External links
 
 

1980 films
1980s avant-garde and experimental films
1980 drama films
Films about Nazi Germany
Films directed by Helma Sanders-Brahms
Films set in the 1940s
Films set in the 1950s
German avant-garde and experimental films
German drama films
1980s German-language films
West German films
Films scored by Jürgen Knieper
1980s German films